One Monkey Don't Stop No Show is the fourth studio album by the Atlanta-based hip hop group Goodie Mob.

Background
This album does not include one of the group's former frontmen, Cee Lo Green, because he broke away to pursue his solo career. That left Khujo, T-Mo, and Big Gipp to hold up the album. One Monkey Don't Stop No Show was released in 2004 under Koch Records, after the critical failure of World Party, the Crunk and Pop experiment, which sold more than any of their other albums. The condensed Goodie Mob returns more to its socially conscious form of its first two releases, Soul Food and Still Standing. The song "Play Your Flutes", featuring Sleepy Brown and Kurupt and produced by J. Wells, was released as the only single off the album.

Track listing

References

2004 albums
Goodie Mob albums
E1 Music albums
Albums produced by Organized Noize